Norman Marvin Krivosha (August 3, 1934 – January 26, 2021) was the chief justice of the Nebraska Supreme Court from 1978, when he was appointed to fill a vacancy, until his retirement on 1987.

Early life and career
Krivosha was born on August 3, 1934, in Detroit, Michigan, the son of David and Molly Krivosha. He moved to Lincoln, Nebraska, where he and his wife, the former Helene Sherman, were active in the Tifereth Israel Synagogue. He received a bachelor's degree in law from the University of Nebraska in 1956 before graduating from its law school two years later. He would later serve as an adjunct professor at his alma mater. He became a partner in the law firm Ginsburg, Rosenberg, Ginsburg & Krivosha until his 1978 appointment to the state supreme court.

Supreme Court and later career
He was a close associate of Governor Jim Exon, who appointed Krivosha as the chief justice of the Nebraska Supreme Court on December 22, 1978. As chief justice, he worked to make the Supreme Court more accessible and understandable, including with the use of television cameras in the courtroom. During his tenure, judges' salaries and pensions were raised, and he successfully campaigned for the merger of county and municipal courts in Lincoln and Omaha. He resigned from the court on July 31, 1987, when he became general counsel for Ameritas until 2000. While with Ameritas, he served as president of the Association of Corporate Counsel. He then opened the first Kutak Rock office in Lincoln, and moved to Naples, Florida in 2005. He served as president of the Jewish Federation in Naples, where he died on January 26, 2021.

Electoral history

References

External links
A 1998 oral history interview of Krivosha for 100th anniversary of the Nebraska State Bar Association

1934 births
2021 deaths
People from Detroit
University of Nebraska alumni
Justices of the Nebraska Supreme Court